Khichdi is an Indian comedy franchise produced by UTV Software Communications in association with Hats Off Productions. The first season originally aired on STAR Plus from September 10, 2002 to July 10, 2004.
Khichdi follows the story of a Gujarati family called Parekhs, who live in an old mansion. The joint family encounters many typically Indian situations, but they try to solve it in the most atypical fashion imaginable. This is a funny bunch of people that is firmly united in their movement to get separated. They want to sell their ancestral property and move out and form their own nuclear families. But the head of their family does not agree.
The show had reruns over Star Utsav and is available for free streaming on Hotstar.

Episodes

References

External links
 

Khichdi
Khichdi